Jordanian nationalism is a nationalistic ideology that considers the Jordanian people a part of a wider Arab Nation. It first emerged in 1920, when Muslim, Christian and Circassian tribes supported Emir Abdullah I in establishing the Emirate of Transjordan, later supporting Jordan's independence from British administration in 1946.

References